The Mobile Rocket Base, abbreviated MORABA, is a department of the DLR Space Operations and Astronaut Training in Oberpfaffenhofen near Munich. Since the 1960s, the MORABA has performed scientific high altitude research missions with unmanned rockets and balloons, and has developed the required mechanical and electrical systems. Their operational areas include upper atmosphere research, microgravity research, astronomy, geophysics, materials science, as well as hypersonic research.

EuroLaunch, a cooperation between MORABA and SSC Esrange, offers international launch services for stratospheric balloons and sounding rockets.
Since 1971, MORABA also cooperates with the Brazilian Instituto de Aeronáutica e Espaço (IAE) of the Departamento de Ciência e Tecnologia Aeroespacial (DCTA).

Divisions of MORABA

Mobile Infrastructure 

The mobile ground stations and antennas for telemetry (reception of data) and tele-command (transmission of control commands), as well as range instrumentation radar stations for the exact trajectory measurement, are part of the Mobile Infrastructure. This includes also ground support systems for communication, power supplies, etc.
The main tasks include tracking the trajectory of sounding rockets or research balloons, RF data reception, data processing, distribution and archiving. Transport, setup and maintenance of the mobile stations, as well as mission preparation, are also part of the activities.

Electrical Flight Systems 

The Electrical Flight Systems group develops, builds, and qualifies the necessary electrical and electronic systems aboard the rockets and balloons. Among others, this includes onboard computer systems, control and measurement equipment, data management and telemetry components, and RF transmission systems. Attitude, rate, and acceleration sensors are calibrated and flown in these systems. Cold gas rate and attitude control systems are developed and qualified by this group. The construction of Electrical Ground Support Equipment (EGSE) is also in the scope of tasks.

Mechanical Flight Systems 

The Mechanical Flight Systems group performs structural calculations, aerodynamic and thermal analyses. Also, mechanical configuration and design of the payload and the entire vehicle are planned and accomplished, as well as the integration of scientific experiments and the spin balancing of the final payload.
Furthermore, this group develops and maintains separation and payload recovery systems.

Launch Services 

The tasks of the Launch Services group include procurement, inspection, modification and storage of rocket motors and pyrotechnics, setup of the mobile launch pads, assembling the rocket stages and ignition systems, integrating the payload and rocket motors, and loading the rocket onto the launcher.
Furthermore, the group is responsible for support of flight safety, trajectory calculations, aerodynamic calculations, and selection of the rocket configuration.

Mechanical and electronic flight systems developed by MORABA 

 Rocket fins and sub structures
 Separation systems of the rocket stages
 De-spin systems to eliminate rocket spin before the experiment phase
 Parachute recovery systems
 TV multichannel transmission systems
 On-board systems for rate, attitude, spin rate, and precession control
 Ignition units for safe ignition of rocket motors and payload pyrotechnics
 Mobile electrical and mechanical ground systems, such as ground stations and launch pads
 Telemetry and tele-command systems
 Integrated radio frequency systems for rockets and balloons

History 

The Mobile Rocket Base emerged from the "Working Group For Space Exploration", a common foundation of the Max Planck Institute for Extraterrestrial Physics (MPE) and the former German Laboratory for Aviation (DVL). This working group was founded in 1965 and had its first headquarters in Munich.
Since April 1969 the Mobile Rocket Base is located in Oberpfaffenhofen, near Munich, in the department "Space Operations and Astronaut Training" of the German Aerospace Center (DLR).

The first mobile campaign to study the solar eclipse in May 1966 on the Greek island of Euboea, on behalf of the European Space Research Organisation (ESRO), demonstrated the feasibility to move and set up extensive technical and scientific equipment in a short time in a remote location.

The beginning: Atmospheric research 

In cooperation with the MPE, a campaign for the study of the magnetic field of the Earth was carried out in the spring of 1967, at Esrange (Sweden). With five Nike-Apache rockets, artificial barium clouds (Aurora Borealis) were created in about 100 km altitude, in order to visualize the magnetic field lines.

In addition to the rocket launch sites in Scandinavia (Kiruna and Andenes), also Sardinia, Wallops Island and Matagorda Island (USA), White Sands (USA), Greenland, Trivandrum (India), Woomera (Australia), Huelva (Spain), Natal (Brazil), and Adelaide Island (Antarctica) were used for the launch of payloads with various scientific purposes.
In the following years, sounding rockets were used mainly in the fields of upper atmosphere and research into the causes of global warming.

New fields of application: Microgravity research 

With the start of the "HEATPIPE 1" payload, manufactured by Dornier, Friedrichshafen, a new field of application for sounding rockets emerged. The launch took place on January 22, 1976 at Esrange, with the aim to investigate the function of heat pipes and latent heat storage in a microgravity environment for their application in future satellite projects.

Initially intended as a supplementary programme for the German Spacelab missions, the first launch of a TEXUS payload took place on December 13, 1977 with a two-stage Skylark rocket at Esrange. In the following years, up to four TEXUS missions (6 minutes of microgravity) were flown per year, with numerous experiments. In order to meet the ever-increasing number of experiments with different requirements and objectives, the Swedish MASER programme, the MAXUS programme (13 minutes microgravity), and the MiniTEXUS programme (3 minutes microgravity) were initiated, under the aegis of the European Space Agency (ESA).

Further tasks: Launch of high altitude research balloons 

Already in May 1975, the Mobile Rocket Base was involved in research balloons with the flight of the 2.5-ton "Spectro-Stratoscope" instrument in Palestine (Texas), for the reception of the PCM data from the payload.
Together with the Max Planck Institute for Aeronomy in Lindau (Harz, Germany), international balloon flights were carried out in Aire-sur-l'Adour (France), Mendoza (Argentina), and Hyderabad (India), to explore the chemical composition (and pollution) of the atmosphere in different altitudes and latitudes.

Technology transfer: From rockets to satellites 

In the early years of German sounding rocket research, the payloads were designed and built by engineers and technicians from the companies Dornier, MBB, Kayser-Threde, and ERNO. Parallel to the withdrawal of Dornier and MBB from payload construction for sounding rockets, MORABA developed and tested, in addition to the already existing spin rate and attitude control modules and parachute recovery systems, mechanical and electrical flight systems which were difficult or impossible to obtain on the market. The first and successful application of a rocket-qualified data acquisition and transmission / reception system on a satellite was in the re-entry experiment "EXPRESS". For this project, in late 1994 a complete transmitting and receiving station with all necessary functions was set up by MORABA in the South Australian desert and was operated over the turn of the year. After the launch with a Japanese satellite launcher and a 7-day orbital flight, the landing of the EXPRESS capsule was planned to occur in the vicinity of the town of Coober Pedy (Australia). However, due to a malfunction of the rocket, the capsule entered an elliptical orbit with very low Perigee and landed in Africa after only a few revolutions.

Further applications of developments of MORABA in space flight missions included experiments aboard the Russian space station Mir and the DLR satellite BIRD.

Latest trend: Hypersonic research - the flying wind tunnel 

Similar to the novel use of the rocket platform for microgravity research, the use of sounding rockets as a flying hypersonic wind tunnel has increased steadily. With the help of sounding rockets, large flight models are brought to speeds of above Mach 12 and reentry periods of up to one minute can be achieved.
For the DLR Sharp Edge Flight Experiment (SHEFEX) MORABA designed and built the payload subsystems and the rocket system. With its launch in October 2005 from Andenes (Norway) the project has been successfully completed.
Further experiments of this kind were the also successfully completed follow-up project SHEFEX II (launched in June 2012), as well as the scramjet engine research programs HIFiRE and Scramspace.

Missions conducted or supported by MORABA

Current projects of MORABA 

 TEXUS: Technology Experiments in Microgravity Environment
 REXUS/BEXUS: Sounding Rocket and Balloon Experiments for University Students
 STERN: Students' Experimental Rockets: Support program for students to develop innovative rocket engines
 MAPHEUS: Material Physics Experiments in Microgravity
 WADIS: Research project of the Leibniz-Institute of Atmospheric Physics in Kühlungsborn, Germany, and the Institute of Space Systems (IRS) of the University of Stuttgart, Germany
 SHEFEX (SHarp Edge Flight Experiment): Program of the German Aerospace Center (DLR)
 MASER: Sounding rocket program of the Swedish Space Corporation (SSC), for microgravity research
 MAXUS: Joint venture between Astrium and the Swedish Space Corporation (SSC) for materials science research in microgravity environment
 HIFiRE: Australian program for the development of a supersonic combustion ramjet (Scramjet)
 MAIUS: Study of a Bose–Einstein condensate in microgravity environment
 ROTEX (ROcket Technology EXperiment): Students' flight experiments of the Institute of Aerodynamics at the RWTH Aachen University
 Corsair (formerly CSSR: Comet Surface Sample Return): Cooperation with NASA. The goal is to take a sample from the surface of a comet nucleus and transport it to Earth.

Selected missions

List of rocket and balloon missions

Further reading 
 Peter Turner: Einmal ins All und zurück. DLR, Oberpfaffenhofen 2007, .
 Burkhard Franke: Forschungsraketen - Technologische Experimente unter Schwerelosigkeit durchgeführt mit TEXUS, MiniTEXUS und MAXUS. Stedinger Verlag, Lemwerder 2007.
 Wilfried Ley, Klaus Wittmann, Willi Hallmann: Handbuch der Raumfahrttechnik. Carl Hanser Verlag, München 2011, .
 Kurt Trettner: Deutschlands Raketen starten in Schweden! In: hobby - Das Magazin der Technik. Nr. 15, 1967, S. 88–92.
 Günther Seibert: The History of Sounding Rockets and Their Contribution to European Space Research. ESA Publications Division, November 2006, .

See also 
 Sounding rocket
 List of sounding rockets
 List of orbital launch systems
 List of rockets launched from Esrange

External links 
 Encyclopedia Astronautica
 Designation-Systems.Net

References 

Space technology
Sounding rockets
Balloons (aeronautics)